The vortex banded mountain snail or whorled mountain snail, scientific name Oreohelix vortex, is a species of air-breathing land snail, a terrestrial pulmonate gastropod mollusk in the family Oreohelicidae. This species is endemic to the United States.

References

Endemic fauna of the United States
Oreohelicidae
Gastropods described in 1932
Taxonomy articles created by Polbot